Henry V. Murphy  (1888–1960) was an American architect who specialized in Catholic churches and schools.

Murphy was born in the village of Horseheads, near Elmira, New York and graduated from the Pratt Institute of Architecture.  He practiced from an office at 1 Hanson Place, Brooklyn, New York City

Works 
Perhaps Murphy's most admired achievement is the Jamaica, Queens campus of St. John's University where he created the master plan for the campus and designed the first four buildings. Although he never had an opportunity to build a church in Manhattan, his Brooklyn churches were greatly admired, which resulted in opportunities to work with Roman Catholic communities throughout the area.

 Our Lady of Refuge Church, Brooklyn, New York City
 Immaculate Heart of Mary Church, Brooklyn
 Immaculate Conception Church, Ditmars, Astoria, Queens, 1950-1955
 Shrine Church of St. Bernadettte, Bay Ridge, Brooklyn, 1937
 St. Anselm's Church, Brooklyn
 St. Andrew Avellino Church, Flushing, Queens, 1940
 Resurrection Church and School, Rye, New York
 Holy Child Jesus Church, Richmond Hill, New York, 1931
 Archbishop Molloy High School, Queens
 The Mary Louis Academy, Jamaica Estates, Queens
 Xaverian High School, Brooklyn
 Holy Cross High School, Flushing, Queens
 St. Mary Mother of Jesus School, Brooklyn
 St. Athanasius' School, Brooklyn
 St. Bernadette's School, Brooklyn
 St. Patrick's School, Bay Shore, New York
 Holy Family School and Convent, Hicksville, New York
 St. James's School and Convent, Seaford, New York
 St. Raphael's School, auditorium, convent and rectory, East Meadow, New York
 Public School 120, Brooklyn
 Public School 287, Brooklyn
 Bushwick Health Center, Bushwick, Brooklyn
 Domestic Relations Courthouse, Brooklyn
 Benedictine Hospital, School of Nursing and Residence, Kingston, New York
 St. Raymond's Church, East Rockaway, New York
 St. Edward the Confessor Church, Syosset, New York
 St. Francis of Assisi Church, Norristown, Pennsylvania
 Our Lady of Grace Church, Greensboro, North Carolina
 Catholic Seaman's Institute, Carroll Gardens, Brooklyn, 1943 (not extant)

References
Notes

External links

1890 births
1960 deaths
People from Elmira, New York
Architects from New York City
Defunct architecture firms based in New York City
20th-century American architects
American ecclesiastical architects
Architects of Roman Catholic churches
Pratt Institute alumni